Drop Kick is an album by saxophonist Steve Coleman and his band Five Elements recorded in 1992 and released by Novus.

Reception
The Allmusic review by Scott Yanow awarded the album 4 stars, stating, "The music is quite original yet fairly accessible due to the rhythms. Recommended".

Track listing
All compositions by Steve Coleman except as indicated
 "Ramses" - 6:36
 "Drop Kick" - 4:52   
 "Terra Nova" (David Gilmore) - 4:37   
 "The Journeyman" - 5:13   
 "Simbius Web" (Steve Coleman, Reggie Washington) - 4:42   
 "Dread Drop" - 4:07   
 "Tschanz" - 11:17   
 "Contemplation" (Marvin "Smitty" Smith) - 5:07   
 "Shift on the Fly" (Andy Milne) - 3:40   
 "Bates Motel" - 8:12   
 "Z Train" - 3:23

Personnel
Steve Coleman - alto saxophone, piano, vocals
James Weidman, Andy Milne - keyboards 
David Gilmore - guitar 
Reggie Washington - bass guitar 
Marvin "Smitty" Smith - drums
with
Michael Wimberly - percussion (tracks 1, 4, 7 & 9)
Don Byron - clarinet, bass clarinet (tracks 1 & 7)
Lance Bryant - tenor saxophone (tracks 1 & 7)
Cassandra Wilson - vocals (track 4)
Meshell Ndegeocello (as Meshell Johnson) - bass (tracks 2, 6 & 11)
Camille Gainer - drums (tracks 2, 6 & 11)
Greg Osby - alto saxophone (tracks 6 & 11)

References 

1992 albums
Steve Coleman albums
Novus Records albums